Saro may refer to:

Places 
Saro, Cantabria, a municipality in Spain
Särö, a locality situated in Halland County, Sweden
Saro, Mali, a village in the Ségou Region of Mali
Saro, the ancient name for the Korean kingdom of Silla and its capital city, Gyeongju

Others 
Saro people, freed slaves who migrated to Nigeria in the beginning of the 1830s
Sir Abdool Raman Osman State College, a secondary school in Phoenix, Mauritius
Saunders-Roe (SARO), a former British aero- and marine-engineering company
Servicios Aéreos Rutas Oriente, a defunct Mexican low-cost airline